The women's 48 kg judo event at the 2019 European Games in Minsk was held on 22 June at the Čyžoŭka-Arena.

Results

Final

Repechage

Top half

Bottom half

References

External links
 
 Draw Sheet

W48
2019
European W48